The JustDrive.com 125 was a NASCAR K&N Pro Series East race held annually at New Jersey Motorsports Park from 2016 to 2018. Will Rodgers won two events, the most of any driver.

History
On December 17, 2015, NJMP announced that it would host a K&N Pro Series East event in 2016; track officials indicated that negotiations had begun with NASCAR as early as 2013. Noah Gragson won the inaugural event. Will Rodgers won the final two editions of the race.

Past winners

References

External links
 

ARCA Menards Series East
Millville, New Jersey
2016 establishments in New Jersey
2018 disestablishments in New Jersey